The 2016 World Singles Ninepin Bowling Classic Championships was the sixth edition of the world singles championships and was held in Novigrad, Croatia, from 22 May to 28 May 2018.

In the men's sprint and single triumphed Vilmoš Zavarko (Serbia), while gold medal in the combined was won by Serbian Igor Kovačić. In the women's sprint triumphed Beata Włodarczyk (Poland), while in the single and combined Croatian Ines Maričić, who set a new world records in both competitions: 675 pins in single and 876 pins in combined. Mixed tandem rivalry was won by Romanians Luminita Viorica Dogaru and Nicolae Lupu.

Participants 
Below is the list of countries who participated in the championships and the requested number of athlete places for each.

  (9)
  (5)
  (10)
  (10)
  (4)
  (4)
  (6)
  (12)
  (12)
  (8)
  (4)
  (6)
  (8)
  (11)
  (7)
  (11)
  (3)

Schedule 
Seven events were held.

All times are local (UTC+2).

Medal summary

Medal table

Men

Women

Mixed

References 

 
World Singles Ninepin Bowling Classic Championships
2016 in bowling
2016 in Croatian sport
International sports competitions hosted by Croatia
May 2016 sports events in Europe